The 1994–95 Los Angeles Kings season, was the Kings' 28th season in the National Hockey League. It saw the Kings finish fifth in the Pacific Division with a record of 16–23–9, for 41 points. Defense proved to be problematic for the Kings, as they allowed a league-high 1,668 shots (34.8 per game) and finished tied for 23rd overall in goals allowed, with 174. Their offense was more reliable, as the Kings averaged nearly 3 goals scored per game. Despite missing a quarter of the season, Rick Tocchet still led the team in goals with 18.

On May 2, the Dallas Stars were in 7th place in the Western Conference with 42 points while the Kings were tied with the San Jose Sharks for 8th place with 41 points (16–22–9). However, the Kings lost the final game of the season on May 3 to the Chicago Blackhawks by a score of 5–1. This meant that the Kings finished in 9th place and therefore miss the playoffs and both San Jose and Dallas clinch playoff berths. After that, the Sharks came from behind to tie the Vancouver Canucks 3–3 in their final game of the season and, in doing so, jumped up to 7th place while the Stars fell to 8th place.

Offseason

Regular season

Final standings

Schedule and results

Player statistics

Forwards
Note: GP = Games played; G = Goals; A = Assists; Pts = Points; PIM = Penalty minutes

Defensemen
Note: GP = Games played; G = Goals; A = Assists; Pts = Points; PIM = Penalty minutes

Goaltending
Note: GP = Games played; W = Wins; L = Losses; T = Ties; SO = Shutouts; GAA = Goals against average

Transactions
The Kings were involved in the following transactions during the 1994–95 season.

Trades

Free agent signings

Free agents lost

Waivers

Draft picks

References
 Kings on Hockey Database

Los Angeles Kings seasons
Los Angeles Kings
Los Angeles Kings
LA Kings
LA Kings